The Honda TR200 series of bikes was produced only in 1986 and 1987. The engine was a  four-stroke OHC single linked to a five-speed transmission and automatic clutch. It featured lever actuated drum brakes on both wheels. This bike was unique in that it used two ATV-type tires. Presently complete bikes are quite uncommon, though replacement parts are readily available as they interchange with other Honda ATCs.

Sources
Big Wheel Showdown - Yamaha BW200ES vs. Honda TR200 Fat Cat Dirt Bike Magazine

TR200
Motorcycles introduced in 1986
Off-road motorcycles